Euxoamorpha ceciliae is a moth of the family Noctuidae. It is found in the Maule Region of Chile.

The wingspan is 33–35 mm. Adults are on wing from December to February.

External links
 Noctuinae of Chile

Noctuinae
Endemic fauna of Chile